The following is a list of films set in Macau:

 Return To Earth - Macau Sci-fi (2023) (2023) - Macanese sci-fi movie 
 Secret Of The Atlantis (2022)
 The Edge Of Human (2022)
 Shang-Chi and the Legend of the Ten Rings (2021)
 Madalena (2021)
 Let's Sing (2021)
 Macao 2525 (2021) - aka The 21st Creator, the first Macanese rotoscoping animated film
 Desireland, Multiverse (2020) - short animation 
 A City Called Macau (2019)
 The Night Comes For Us (2018)
 Now You See Me 2 (2016)
 Return of the Cuckoo (2015)
 Guia In Love (2015)
  Tricycle Thief (2014)
 Unbeatable (2013)
 A Última Vez Que Vi Macau (2012)
 Skyfall (2012)
 Lorcha, na Rota do Sol Nascente (2012) - Portuguese documentary
 Vase Girl (2011) - stop motion animation 
 Johnny English Reborn (2011)
 Nada tenho de meu (2011) - a series of short films
 3 Acts (2010) - short film
 Cuo guo di mei li shi guang (2010)
 Look for a Star (2009)
 Quake De Love (2009)
 Roulette City (2009) dir. Thomas Lim
 Vengeance (2009)
 Rua de Macau (2008)
 Confession of Pain (2006) - several scenes in Macau
 Isabella (2006) - starring Chapman To and Isabella Leong
 Exiled (2006) - directed by Johnnie To
 b420 (2005) - starring Miki Yeung
 Eros (2004) - segment "The Hand"
 Butterfly (2004)
 2046 (2004) - scene filmed in Hospedaria San Va
 Love is not a Sin (2003)
 Fulltime Killer (2001)
 Macau entre dois mundos (1999) - Portuguese series of short films
 O dragão de fumo (1999) - Portuguese series of short films
 História de macau (1999) - Chinese series of short films
 As duas faces de cláudia (1999) - Portuguese series of short films
 The Longest Nite (1998)
 O homem da bicicleta (1997) - Portuguese film
 A Trança Feitiçeira (1996) - Portuguese film adaptation of a classic Macau novel
 Young and Dangerous 1 (1996) - several scenes in Macau
 Exílio dourado em Macau (1995) - Portuguese film
 Guardian Angel (1994) - martial arts film starring Cynthia Rothrock
 Love and Tiny Toes (1993) - Portuguese film directed by Luís Filipe Rocha and starring Joaquim de Almeida and Ana Torrent
 Dragon: The Bruce Lee Story (1993) - scene set in Macau
 The Untold Story (1993)
 Casino Tycoon 2 (1992)
 Casino Tycoon (1992)
 Pedicab Driver (1989) - directed by Sammo Hung
 All About Ah-Long (1989) - directed by Johnnie To; the Guia Circuit of the Macau Grand Prix was the setting for the final motorcycle race
 O regresso (1988) - Portuguese film
 Macao, die ruckseite des meeres (1988) - Swiss film
 Zegen (1987)
 Shanghai Surprise (1986) - scenes shot in Macau
 Shangri-la (1985) - scenes shot in Macau
 A ilha de moraes (1984) - Portuguese film about Macau and Japan figure Wenceslau de Moraes
 Indiana Jones and the Temple of Doom (1984)
 A ilha dos amores (1982) - Portuguese film
 Spearhead, the macau connection (1981)
 Cleopatra Jones and the Casino of Gold (1975) - action-adventure Blaxploitation movie starring Tamara Dobson as Cleopatra
 007, The Man with the Golden Gun (1974) - scene in Macau's casinos, shops and alleys
 Os corruptos (1967)
 Operação estupefacientes (1966) - Portuguese documentary about narcotics
 Via macau (1966)
 Out of the Tiger's Mouth (1962)
 A night in hong kong (1961)
 Ferry to Hong Kong (1959)
 Love Is a Many-Splendored Thing (1955)
 Caminhos Longos (1955) - Portuguese film, now lost
 Forbidden / Amor Proibido (1953)
 Macao (1952) - starring Robert Mitchum and Jane Russell
 Camões, Erros Meus, Má Fortuna, Amor Ardente (1946) - Portuguese film focusing on the life of the poet Luís Vaz de Camões, who lived in Macau with his Chinese bride
 Macao, l'enfer du jeu (1942) - directed by Jean Delannoy, starring Erich von Stroheim
 Macau - Aspectos Pitorescos (1935) - early Portuguese film clips
 Macau (1928) - early Portuguese film clips
 Asas de Portugal - Saudação aos aviadores do Raid Lisboa-Macau (1924) - early Portuguese film clips
 Aspectos de Macau (1923) - early Portuguese film clips

See also
 List of films based on location
 List of films set in Hong Kong
 List of films set in Shanghai

References

 
Macau
Films set in Macau
Films set in Macau